n/naka is a two-Michelin-star modern kaiseki restaurant located in Los Angeles, founded by chef Niki Nakayama. The name is a portmanteau of Nakayama's first and last name. In 2019, n/naka was named to Food & Wines 30 best restaurants in the world.

History
Nakayama opened the restaurant after selling her first venture, acclaimed sushi restaurant Azami, in 2008. After selling Azami, she purchased the building that now houses n/naka, and ran her sister's restaurant in Arcadia. Nakayama originally intended to build an open kitchen, with food preparation visible to diners, but ultimately decided against it, preferring that diners not see her and focus instead on the food. Carole Iida, is a sous-chef and partner at n/naka. She joined the restaurant in 2012, after closing her own sushi restaurant.

In 2019, n/naka received two Michelin stars in the Michelin Guide, one of only six Los Angeles restaurants receiving two Michelin stars.

The New Yorker called n/naka the most prominent kaiseki restaurant in America.

The restaurant is featured in Season 1 of the critically acclaimed Netflix original series, Chef's Table.

As is the case with many kaiseki restaurants, most ingredients used at n/naka are sourced locally.

See also
 List of Michelin starred restaurants in Los Angeles and Southern California

References

Asian restaurants in Los Angeles
2011 establishments in California
Japanese restaurants in California
Michelin Guide starred restaurants in California
Restaurants established in 2011
Restaurants in Los Angeles
Restaurants in California